New Waverly Independent School District is a public school district based in New Waverly, Texas (USA).  A small portion of New Waverly ISD also goes into the city limits of Huntsville.

In 2009, the school district was rated "academically acceptable" by the Texas Education Agency.

Schools
New Waverly High (Grades 9-12)
New Waverly Junior High (Grades 6-8)
New Waverly Intermediate (Grades 4-5)
New Waverly Elementary (Grades PK-3)

References

External links
New Waverly ISD

School districts in Walker County, Texas